Maya Rehberg (born 28 April 1994) is a German athlete specializing in the 3,000-meter steeplechase. She won the bronze medal at the 2013 European Junior Championships.

American university career
Rehberg attended Iona College, an NCAA Division I institution in New Rochelle, New York as a freshman in 2013–14 and set a school 3k steeplechase record with a time of 9:55.73 at the 2014 NCAA Division I Outdoor Track and Field Championships in Eugene, Oregon. On the indoor track, Rehberg set the Iona rookie record in both the 3,000- and 5,000-meter events. Her time of 9:24.51 at the ECAC Championships ranks third all-time at Iona. She was also runner-up at the 2013 MAAC Cross Country Championship and Iona's second finisher at the 2013 NCAA Northeast Regional Cross Country Championship.

International competitions

1Disqualified in the final

Personal bests
Outdoor
1500 metres – 4:20.55 (Bochum 2012)
3000 metres – 9:15.39 (Osterode 2015)
5000 metres – 16:30.49 (Bremen 2013)
3000 metres steeplechase – 9:39.18 (Prague 2016)

Indoor
1500 metres – 4:26.59 (Halle 2013)
One mile – 4:44.30 (Boston 2014)
3000 metres – 9:24.51 (Boston  2014)
5000 metres – 17:17.57 (New York 2014)

External links

All-Athletics Profile
Iona Gaels Profile

References

1994 births
Living people
German female steeplechase runners
Iona Gaels women's track and field athletes
Athletes (track and field) at the 2016 Summer Olympics
Olympic athletes of Germany